The Tacoma Rockets were a junior ice hockey team in the Western Hockey League (WHL) from 1991 to 1995. They played at the Tacoma Dome in Tacoma, Washington. The Rockets were granted as an expansion franchise, and were named after the defunct professional team of the same name. After the 1994–95 season, low attendance forced the team to move to Kelowna, British Columbia after only four seasons, where they became the Kelowna Rockets. While the Rockets drew high attendance numbers when they played the Seattle Thunderbirds, they did not draw as well with other teams.  The Tacoma Dome was not well-suited for hockey as the risers for the seats were too shallow, making the sightlines bad for hockey.

Franchise history 

Marcel Comeau was hired to be the first coach of the Rockets, and stayed with the team all four seasons. The 1991–92 season marks the first season of the expansion side Rockets, who began play in the Tacoma Dome, one of North America's largest hockey arenas. The inaugural Rockets blasted their way to one of the most memorable inaugural seasons in the 25-year history of the Western Hockey League. Attendance of 14,975 and 15,240 at two heated contests against their then arch rival, the Seattle Thunderbirds. This assisted the Rockets in chalking up the highest per game average for a first year expansion team under the Canadian Hockey League umbrella.

In 1992–93, the Rockets startled everyone in the league by winning 24 straight home games for an all-time Western Hockey League record. Tacoma held first place in the West Division for three months and finished with a promising 45–27–0 season. Head coach Marcel Comeau won the Dunc McCallum Memorial Trophy as the WHL coach of the year, and the CHL Coach of the Year Award as well. In addition to their winning streak, the Rockets home record of 36–6–0 and collecting 37 more points than the previous year, proved them serious contenders in the WHL. Once again the Rockets attendance of 13,769 saw them defeat the Seattle Thunderbirds 4-2 in win number 24, marking the third largest crowd in the history of the WHL. Three Rockets won best in the WHL West. Goaltender, Jeff Calvert – Most Valuable Player; Michal Sykora – Most Valuable Player; and Jamie Black selected as Most Sportsmanlike Player.

The 1993–94 season marked the year of transition for the Rockets, with the graduation of high scoring veteran Allan Egeland, a solid forward, Trever Fraser, and netminder, Jeff Calvert. The Rockets' third season also brought forward some of the league's best rookies and a phenomenal base of nine NHL drafted players. Six alone were selected in 1994, bringing the total to thirteen Rockets drafted in three seasons. Rockets finished third in the Western Hockey League with a 33–34–5 record.

With a strong finish in the 1993–94 season, the Rockets strove to compete at a higher level of excellence. They launched their third season boasting size in defense and the strength of nine NHL draft picks. Adding the skill and talent of one of Europe's top young forwards, Vaclav Varada, who slotted 50 points and tied the team's rookie scoring record. Todd MacDonald, 1993 Florida Panthers draft choice, became the team's top goalie, nominated for the Best in the West award. Veteran Dallas Thompson became team Captain. This combination brought the Rockets to a second-place finish in the West.

Season-by-season records 
Note: GP = Games played, W = Wins, L = Losses, T = Ties Pts = Points, GF = Goals for, GA = Goals against

NHL alumni

References 

Defunct Western Hockey League teams
Defunct ice hockey teams in the United States
Sports in Tacoma, Washington
Ice hockey teams in Washington (state)